Hans Baumann may refer to:

Hans Baumann (handball) (1906–1971), Swiss architect and former President of International Handball Federation
Hans Baumann (writer) (1914–1988), German poet, songwriter, and author of children's books
Hans Baumann (bobsleigh) (born 1932), bobsledder who represented West Germany at the 1968 Winter Olympics
Hans Baumann (inventor), German-American inventor and engineer
Hans Baumann (pentathlete) (born 1905), modern pentathlete who represented Switzerland at the 1936 Summer Olympics
Hans Baumann (photographer) (1893–1985), German photographer, photojournalist, and art collection
Hans Baumann (skier) (born 1910), skier who represented Austria at the 1936 Winter Olympics